Their Rock Is Not Our Rock is the third studio album by American rock band Fireball Ministry, released via Liquor and Poker Music in 2005. The album features the song "The Broken", which is recognized for its use in the video game WWE SmackDown! vs. Raw 2006.

Track listing

References

Fireball Ministry albums
2005 albums